Đorđe Ćosić (born 11 September 1995) is a Bosnian professional footballer who plays as a centre-back for Serbian SuperLiga club Mladost Novi Sad.

Career
He started his senior career in Zvijezda 09, for which he performed in Second League of RS,  and then in First League of RS. Then he played in Drina Zvornik. He also performed for Vitez, before he signed a contract with Borac Banja Luka. He left the club in September 2021. The following year he performed for Shakhter Karagandy, at the beginning of 2023 he became a member of Mladost Novi Sad.

Career statistics

Club

Honours
Borac Banja Luka
Bosnian Premier League: 2020–21

References

External links
Đorđe Ćosić at Sofascore

1995 births
Living people
Footballers from Sarajevo
Bosnia and Herzegovina footballers
Association football defenders
FK Drina Zvornik players
NK Vitez players
FK Borac Banja Luka players
FC Shakhter Karagandy players
Premier League of Bosnia and Herzegovina players
First League of the Republika Srpska players
Kazakhstan Premier League players
Serbian SuperLiga players
Bosnia and Herzegovina expatriate footballers
Expatriate footballers in Kazakhstan
Bosnia and Herzegovina expatriate sportspeople in Kazakhstan
Expatriate footballers in Serbia
Bosnia and Herzegovina expatriate sportspeople in Serbia